Eom In-yeong (born 29 May 1971) is a South Korean cyclist. He competed in the men's keirin at the 2000 Summer Olympics.

References

External links
 

1971 births
Living people
South Korean male cyclists
Olympic cyclists of South Korea
Cyclists at the 2000 Summer Olympics
Place of birth missing (living people)